is a freight terminal operated by Japan Freight Railway Company (JR Freight) located in Okayama, Okayama Prefecture, Japan. It was called  until March 26, 2016.

Railway freight terminals in Japan
Railway stations in Okayama Prefecture
Sanyō Main Line
Railway stations in Japan opened in 1969
Okayama